Un flic (also known as Dirty Money) is a 1972 Franco-Italian crime film, the last directed by Jean-Pierre Melville before his death the following year. It stars Alain Delon, Richard Crenna, and Catherine Deneuve. Delon had previously played a criminal in Melville's Le Samouraï (1967) and Le Cercle Rouge (1970), but in Un Flic his role is reversed, and he plays the title character.

Plot
On a rainy winter day in Saint-Jean-de-Monts, France, Simon and his four-man crew rob a bank. Marc Albouis and Paul Weber come inside with Simon, while Louis Costa, the getaway driver, waits outside. As they are about to leave, the teller sets off the alarm and shoots Marc, who shoots and kills the teller. The crew manages to escape with a bag of money and drives back to Paris, where they put Marc in a private clinic under the name "Schmidt".

Commissaire Edouard Coleman spends his nights driving around Paris from crime scene to crime scene. He also meets with his informants, such as Gaby, a transgender prostitute who is currently feeding him information about an upcoming drug shipment that involves one of her clients. Edouard goes to the nightclub Simon owns just after it closes for the night and plays the piano while Simon's girlfriend, Cathy, watches and the employees clean up. Simon gets back from Saint-Jean-de-Monts, and Edouard greets him with a friendly look before getting called away by his partner, Inspector Morand.

Deciding they have to get Marc out of the clinic before the police search the facility, Simon, Louis, and Paul get an ambulance and make fake transfer paperwork. A nurse says Marc is too sick to be moved and will not release him to them, however, so they send Cathy into his room dressed as a nurse, and she injects air into his IV, causing a fatal embolism. Edouard catches the case of trying to figure out the true identity of "Schmidt", but he does not expect to succeed. He meets Cathy in a hotel room for a tryst and, when she asks if he thinks Simon suspects anything, says he thinks Simon has always known about their affair.

It turns out Simon only robbed the bank to fund his plan to steal a shipment of heroin, which just so happens to be the same shipment Edouard hopes to intercept. The mule, Mathieu "la Valise", boards a night train from Paris to Lisbon, and his associates deliver the drugs to him in Bordeaux, so Edouard makes arrangements for Mathieu to be picked up in Bayonne. However, Simon's crew have bought a helicopter, which Louis hovers over the moving train once it is out in the country. Paul lowers Simon onto the roof, and Simon breaks into Mathieu's cabin, knocks Mathieu out, and steals the drugs.

Furious that the drugs were not recovered, Edouard berates Gaby and slaps her around for supposedly giving him bad information. When Morand brings him the news that Marc had a criminal record, so investigators were able to learn his real name, Edouard recognizes it as that of an associate of Louis, who is a known associate of Simon. He calls Simon, who is not available, and then calls his chief to ask if Marc's name can be kept out of the news, but the chief says he is too late.

Edouard arrests Louis at a restaurant and brings him to the precinct, where he somehow (likely using some form of torture) manages to get the seemingly-indomitable man to name Simon and Paul. He goes to Simon's club alone and asks Simon if he knows Marc, Paul, or Louis, which Simon denies, and then lets Simon know Louis talked before leaving. Simon calls to warn Paul, but Edouard and some of his men arrive outside his building as they talk. While the police burst into Paul's apartment and past his wife, he gets a gun, and Edouard lets him shoot himself in the head.

Simon takes the drugs and hides out in a hotel, but, when he calls Cathy to pick him up, the police trace the call. As he walks to her car, Edouard, gun drawn, calls his name and tells him not to move. He approaches Edouard and reaches into his overcoat, so Edouard shoots. When no gun is found on Simon's body, Morand asks why Edouard shot so quickly, and Edouard says he was not sure Simon was going to kill himself. Edouard and Cathy exchange a look before he and Morand go off to work on another case. Their car phone rings, but they do not answer.

Cast and crew

The film's crew included Alain Delon's brother, Jean-François Delon (first assistant director); Jean Gabin's daughter, Florence Moncorgé (script supervisor); and Jacques Tati's son, Pierre Tati (second assistant director), and daughter, Sophie Tati (assistant editor).

References

External links

1972 films
French crime thriller films
1970s French-language films
1970s crime thriller films
French heist films
French neo-noir films
Police detective films
Films directed by Jean-Pierre Melville
Films produced by Robert Dorfmann
Films scored by Michel Colombier
1970s heist films
1970s French films